Rodrigo Elvio Ayala (born 11 August 1994) is an Argentine professional footballer who plays as a left-back for Nueva Chicago.

Career 
Ayala's first club were Argentine Primera División side Estudiantes, he didn't make an appearance for the club but was an unused substitute for a league match with Rosario Central on 17 April 2015. Whilst with Estudiantes, Ayala spent the 2016–17 season out on loan with Los Andes of Primera B Nacional. He made his professional debut on 28 August 2016, playing the second half in an away win to Douglas Haig. Eleven further appearances followed in a season which Los Andes ended 13th. On 31 July 2017, Ayala left Estudiantes permanently to sign for Primera B Metropolitana team Villa San Carlos. He featured fourteen times.

July 2018 saw Ayala make a move to recently-relegated Primera B Nacional club Chacarita Juniors.

Career statistics 
.

References

External links 

1994 births
Living people
People from Berazategui Partido
Argentine footballers
Association football defenders
Argentine Primera División players
Primera Nacional players
Primera B Metropolitana players
Estudiantes de La Plata footballers
Club Atlético Los Andes footballers
Club Atlético Villa San Carlos footballers
Chacarita Juniors footballers
Independiente Rivadavia footballers
Club Comunicaciones footballers
Nueva Chicago footballers
Sportspeople from Buenos Aires Province